The Nore Valley Way is a long-distance trail under development in County Kilkenny, Ireland. It is designated as a National Waymarked Trail by the National Trails Office of the Irish Sports Council and is managed by Trail Kilkenny, a group made up of representatives of Kilkenny County Council, County Kilkenny LEADER Partnership, Kilkenny Sports Partnership and local landowners. Two stages are open at present: the first from Kilkenny to Bennettsbridge and the second from Thomastown to Inistioge. The final section – linking Bennettsbridge and Thomastown – is under construction. 

References

External links
 trailKilkenny
 Nore Valley Way at IrishTrails.ie

Long-distance trails in the Republic of Ireland
Geography of County Kilkenny
Tourist attractions in County Kilkenny